Timi Zajc (born 26 April 2000) is a Slovenian ski jumper.

Career

Continental Cup
In September 2017 in Trondheim, Zajc finished on the podium for the first time in his career after finishing third in the first competition and winning the second competition.

World Cup debut
He made his World Cup debut at the 2017–18 season opening in Wisła, competing in the qualifying round of the individual event.

Major tournament results

Winter Olympics

FIS Nordic World Ski Championships

FIS Ski Flying World Championships

World Cup results

Standings

Individual wins

Individual starts

References

External links

2000 births
Living people
Skiers from Ljubljana
Slovenian male ski jumpers
Place of birth missing (living people)
Ski jumpers at the 2018 Winter Olympics
Ski jumpers at the 2022 Winter Olympics
Medalists at the 2022 Winter Olympics
Olympic ski jumpers of Slovenia
Olympic gold medalists for Slovenia
Olympic silver medalists for Slovenia
Olympic medalists in ski jumping
21st-century Slovenian people
FIS Nordic World Ski Championships medalists in ski jumping